The Gemini Twin is an American powered parachute that was designed and produced by Gemini Powered Parachutes of Culver, Indiana. Now out of production, when it was available the aircraft was supplied as a complete ready-to-fly-aircraft.

The aircraft was introduced in about 2002 and production ended when the company went out of business in 2007.

Design and development
The Twin was designed by a former Buckeye Industries employee to comply with the Fédération Aéronautique Internationale microlight category and the US FAR 103 Ultralight Vehicles rules as an ultralight trainer. It features a  parachute-style wing, two-seats-in-tandem accommodation, tricycle landing gear and a single  Rotax 582 engine in pusher configuration.

The aircraft carriage is built from a combination of bolted aluminium and 4130 steel tubing. In flight steering is accomplished via foot pedals that actuate the canopy brakes, creating roll and yaw. On the ground the aircraft has lever-controlled nosewheel steering. The main landing gear incorporates spring suspension. The acceptable power range is 

Operational history
In 2005 the company reported 60 examples had been completed and flown. In July 2015, 15 examples were registered in the United States with the Federal Aviation Administration.

In 2004 Jean Pierre la Camus reviewed the design in the World Directory of Leisure Aviation and described the Twin as "soundly engineered".

Specifications (Twin)

References

External links
Official website archives on Archive.org

Twin
2000s United States sport aircraft
2000s United States ultralight aircraft
Single-engined pusher aircraft
Powered parachutes